Indictment: The McMartin Trial is a film made for television that originally aired on HBO on May 20, 1995. Indictment is based on the true story of the McMartin preschool trial.

Oliver Stone and Abby Mann were executive producers of the film, which was directed by Mick Jackson.

The cast includes James Woods and Mercedes Ruehl, as opposing defense and prosecuting attorneys in the McMartin trial. Henry Thomas, Sada Thompson and Shirley Knight co-star as the defendants in the case, with Lolita Davidovitch as a child-abuse therapist whose findings were crucial to the prosecution's case and Roberta Bassin as the mother who initiated the case.

Summary
A defense lawyer defends an average American family from shocking allegations of child abuse and satanic rituals. After seven years and $16 million, the trial ends with the dismissal of all charges. George Freeman is the star witness in the trial. Kee MacFarlane and Wayne Satz are in a romantic relationship.  The poster and ads for the movie declare "The charges were so shocking, the truth didn't matter."

Cast

 James Woods as Danny Davis
 Mercedes Ruehl as Lael Rubin
 Lolita Davidovitch as Kee MacFarlane
 Henry Thomas as Ray Buckey
 Sada Thompson as Virginia McMartin
 Shirley Knight as Peggy Buckey
 Alison Elliott as Peggy Ann Buckey
 Roberta Bassin as Judy Johnson
 Mark Blum as Wayne Satz
 Richard Bradford as Ira Reiner
 James Cromwell as Judge Pounders
 Chelsea Field as Christine Johnson
 Richard Portnow as Judge George

Reception
John J. O'Connor, writing for The New York Times:

Also writing for The New York Times, Seth Mydans said:

The Los Angeles Times described the docudrama as "HBO’s frothing, highly opinionated account of the case".  Variety reports this "fact-based HBO Pictures presentation ... makes no apologies for depicting the infamous child molestation case as a witch hunt" and leaves "little leeway for surprise.  Even so, the well-acted cabler hits its targets with a take-no-prisoners gusto".

Accolades

Impact
The film is cited as a watershed in the shift of ideas about satanic ritual abuse, recasting Ray Buckey as a victim of a hysterical conspiracy rather than a child abuser.

References

External links

1995 television films
1995 films
American films based on actual events
Films about miscarriage of justice
HBO Films films
Films directed by Mick Jackson
American docudrama films
Primetime Emmy Award for Outstanding Made for Television Movie winners
Best Miniseries or Television Movie Golden Globe winners
Films about child abuse
Satanic ritual abuse hysteria in the United States
American drama television films
1990s American films